U-86 may refer to one of the following German submarines:

 , a Type U 81 submarine launched in 1916 and that served in the First World War until surrendered on 20 November 1918; sank in English Channel on the way to being broken up in 1921
 During the First World War, Germany also had this submarine with a similar name:
 , a Type UB III submarine launched in 1917 and surrendered on 24 November 1918; dumped on beach at Falmouth after explosive trials 1921 and broken up in situ
 , a Type VIIB submarine that served in the Second World War until sunk on 29 November 1943

Submarines of Germany